Drosera radicans is an erect perennial tuberous species in the carnivorous plant genus Drosera. It is endemic to Western Australia and is only found in a relatively small area north of Geraldton. It grows in winter-wet areas in sand or sandy clay soils. White flowers bloom from August to September.

Drosera radicans was first described by N. G. Marchant in 1982.

See also
List of Drosera species

References

Carnivorous plants of Australia
Caryophyllales of Australia
Eudicots of Western Australia
Plants described in 1982
radicans